Lansing Township is one of eighteen townships in Allamakee County, Iowa, USA.  At the 2010 census, its population was 1424.

History
Lansing Township was organized in 1852.

Geography
According to the USGS, it contains five cemeteries: Gethsemane, Heminway, Lansing Ridge, May's Prairie and Oak Hill.

References

External links
 US-Counties.com
 City-Data.com

Townships in Allamakee County, Iowa
Townships in Iowa
1852 establishments in Iowa
Populated places established in 1852